June Fulton is an international lawn bowler from Botswana.

Fulton was a winner or runner-up in Harare W.B.A competitions from 1977 to 1983 and was selected for the 1985 World Outdoor Bowls Championship.

Three years later she won a silver medal with Heather Roberts in the pairs at the 1988 World Outdoor Bowls Championship in Auckland.

References

Living people
Year of birth missing (living people)